is a fictional city from the Final Fantasy media franchise. First appearing in the 1997 video game Final Fantasy VII, Midgar is depicted as a bustling metropolis built, occupied and controlled by the fictional megacorporation Shinra Electric Power Company (神羅電気動力株式会社). The city is powered by electricity drawn from reactors which run on "Mako" (魔晄, magic light), the processed form of spiritual energy forcibly extracted by Shinra from beneath the surface of the planetary world in which the Final Fantasy VII metaseries takes place. Shinra's activities drain the world of its life force, the "Lifestream", threatening the existence of all life as the planet weakens. In spin-offs of the game, the city spanned a town named .

Midgar is a major aspect of the metaseries' industrial or post-industrial science fiction milieu with recurring appearances in related media, and is the centerpiece of the 2020 video game Final Fantasy VII Remake. Considered to be one of the most memorable aspects of the original Final Fantasy VII, Midgar has been well received by critics and the video game community for its cyberpunk aesthetic and dystopian setting. Midgar is featured prominently in discussions about Final Fantasy VII themes of class conflict and environmentalism.

Development
Final Fantasy VII was originally envisioned to be set in an alternate version of New York City, before the development team made the decision to switch to the fictional city of Midgar. Yusuke Naora, the art director for Final Fantasy VII, designed many of the locations for the game. Contrary to popular belief that Midgar's "steampunk" aesthetic is influenced by works like the  1982 science fiction film Blade Runner, Naora said that he had the image of a pizza in mind when he originally designed Midgar and its distinctive plate-like structure. Other in-game elements themed after pizza include Domino, the name of Midgar's mayor, and the musical theme "Underneath the Rotting Pizza" which plays in various Midgar levels. Like many other story elements in Final Fantasy VII, the name of the city is inspired by Norse mythology.

The 2020 video game Final Fantasy VII Remake focuses on the city of Midgar as it is a highly recognizable symbol of the world of Final Fantasy VII. The iteration of Midgar for Remake had to be redesigned from scratch, as the process of converting the original's 2D backgrounds into a 3D space reveal many "structural contradictions". The planning process began with Midgar's original design, and from there, the team created architectural documents outlining how the city's various aspects should work. The development team's goal is to not only make Midgar's environments larger and denser, but also takes into consideration their functionality as they wanted to expand the city in a way that made sense. The developers set out to make Midgar's environments realistic by adjusting its scale regarding the size between the buildings and the density. In Remake, Midgar's sights and locales references architectural inspiration from all over the world, and channel these influences through the developers' use of materials, light, and space. For example, the city's bus signs heavily resemble their real world counterparts in New York City. Remake producer Yoshinori Kitase noted that the developmental team wanted to show a different design aesthetic which presents Midgar with strong elements of colour and variety, and the lighting and colouring used in Remake is intended to accentuate the uniqueness of the game world. The development team opted not to use a "photo-realistic approach", but instead something more stylized to honor the artistic designs and choices of the original game. Environment director on Final Fantasy VII Remake Takako Miyake noted that whenever the team extracted Midgar's design elements from the original, they were "focused on combinations that unconditionally inspired excitement, consistency aside". In retrospect, the team praised Midgar's eclectic aesthetic from the original game as they felt it was the most captivating aspect of its setting, and felt that it is important to make sure each area felt distinct or else it would become monotonous.

The developers of Remake wanted to show more of the ordinary citizens living in Midgar to give players a better sense of the city and its culture. The roles of previously minor characters have been expanded for this purpose. The original version starts with Cloud's first bombing mission with AVALANCHE as the intention  at the time was to start the game in the middle of the action; Remake instead opens with mundane scenes of everyday life for Midgar's citizens, as it developers felt that going straight from the bombing mission into the streets amid panicked citizens is insufficient to convey the impact of the Mako reactor's destruction has on people's lives. The developers also intended to introduce some nuance into the sequence of events before and after the explosion of the Mako reactor, by having players second-guess AVALANCHE's eco-terrorist activities and placing an emphasis on the fact that innocent people suffer regardless of who is truly responsible for the chaos in the aftermath of the reactor's destruction.

Director Tetsuya Nomura acknowledged that concerns were raised with regards to the scope for 2020's Remake, but did not feel that expansion of Midgar as a setting would be problematic: he explained that while it takes about seven hours to go through the Midgar section in the original game, he said the overall gameplay of Remake, when taking into consideration travel time involved with traversing a fully three-dimensional map in Midgar along with expanded story content, is enough to cover an entire game. The story and scenario writer for Remake, Kazushige Nojima, said that stopping the game at the point the party departs Midgar would also allow for an adequate amount of planned story scenarios to be incorporated throughout its narrative.

Background
Midgar is located on a world referred to as "the Planet" by series characters, and which is retroactively named "Gaia" in some Square Enix promotional material and by Square Enix staff. Midgar is originally formed from the consolidation of several smaller, independent towns in the distant past; each settlement made up one sector and gradually lost its original name. The city is ruled by the Shinra Electric Power Company  and is powered by Shinra's "Mako" reactors. The city has two principal components: an elevated, circular plate supported by both a central pillar and a system of smaller columns, as well as a network of slums beneath the plate. The upper plate contains office buildings and similar complexes, as well as theatres, bars and various residences. The plate itself is divided into eight sectors, with each sector punctuated by two walls and a Mako reactor. The city's prosperity is due to the abundance of Mako energy in the vicinity, and the reactor complex meant that there is little to no vegetation within the city or in close proximity to it. A commuter railway system carried workers to and from the slums, and security measures are implemented throughout the city. A network of maintenance platforms are suspended beneath the plate. In the sections below the plate lived the destitute citizens in their slum dwellings. The majority of the buildings there are made of collected scrap shaped into dwellings; few of the buildings displayed any thorough architectural planning, with the slums as a whole littered with a large amount of wreckage.

At some point in its history, Midgar went to war with the nation of Wutai. Shinra developed a means of mass-producing and weaponizing "materia", small spheres of crystallized Mako energy that grants its user magical abilities, as well as an army of genetically enhanced elite military units called "SOLDIER". With the development of these two assets, Shinra won the war against Wutai, and established Midgar as their seat of power and influence in the wider world by the events of Final Fantasy VII. At one point, Shinra had developed a space exploration program, but following the war with Wutai and the discovery of the profitability of processing Mako energy, Shinra prioritized research on Mako and its applications and consolidated their operations around the harvesting of Mako energy, effectively cancelling the space program.

Level content
In Final Fantasy VII and its spin-off media, player characters may visit multiple sectors within Midgar. Noteworthy sectors include:

 The Sector 5 slums, home of Aerith Gainsborough and her adoptive mother, Elmyra Gainsborough. A disused church tended by Aerith and the area adjacent to Elmyra's house are among the few places with patches of green in the city. 
 The Sector 6 slums, a broken-down passageway between Sectors 5 and 7. Wall Market is the largest and most populated area of Sector 6, and also serves as a red light district. Noteworthy locations include the Honeybee Inn and the mansion of notorious slum dilettante, Don Corneo. 
 The Sector 7 slums, where AVALANCHE is headquartered in a bar called "7th Heaven" run by Tifa Lockhart. Inside the Sector 7 slums is the Train Graveyard, a dark and dangerous area of scrapped trains resembling a maze.
 Sector 0 contains Shinra's headquarters, a massive building located in the center column of the upper plate, and the tallest structure in Midgar. From their offices, Shinra staff run almost every element of Midgar, from the news media to the reactors that power the metropolis.

Appearances

Video games

Final Fantasy VII
Midgar serves as the setting of the early hours of Final Fantasy VII. The eco-terrorist group AVALANCHE, with the assistance of Cloud Strife, engineered successful bombing missions that temporarily put two Mako reactors out of commission by the events of Final Fantasy VII. In retaliation, the Turks destroyed the pillar holding up the section of the upper plate above Sector 7's slums. This caused the plate to collapse and crush the slums below, killing many of its residents. Shinra executives, hoping that all members of AVALANCHE would be killed in the calamity, blamed the incident on AVALANCHE in order to sway public opinion against the insurgents.

Following the capture of Cloud's party by Shinra during their raid on the company headquarters, President Shinra reveals his desire to discover the supposed Promised Land, where a "Neo-Midgar" would be built. The president claimed this land would be so abundant in Mako to such an extent that it would flow out of the ground of its own accord without the need for Mako reactors to siphon it, which would, in turn, increase Shinra's profits exponentially.

Some time later, Shinra moved a large Mako-powered cannon from a military installation in Junon to Midgar. It is modified into a superweapon called "the Sister Ray" through its integration with the city's Mako reactor network, with the goal of destroying an energy barrier Sephiroth had conjured to protect himself in the Northern Crater after summoning the planet-destroying spell known as "Meteor". The cannon succeeds, but a simultaneous attack by a rampaging Weapon damaged some areas of Midgar, destroying the upper floors of the Shinra headquarters. At the same time, Cloud's party infiltrate the city, defeating several of Shinra's remaining Shinra and disabling the Sister Ray, which is on the verge of destroying the entire city due to a power overload incited by Professor Hojo, the head of Shinra's Science Department.

The game's ending cutscene reveals that the Meteor is descending towards Midgar, but it is stopped by the combined effort of a Holy spell summoned by Aerith and the planet's Lifestream. In a post-credits scene set five hundred years after the crisis brought by Sephiroth, Midgar is shown to be abandoned and overgrown with greenery.

Before Crisis: Final Fantasy VII
In the prequel Before Crisis: Final Fantasy VII, Midgar experiences an insurgency waged by an earlier iteration of the eco-terrorist AVALANCHE organization. The story follows a number of Turk operatives working with Shinra's armed forces to combat the threat. In one instance, Midgar is nearly destroyed in its entirety by the large cannon stationed at Junon, which AVALANCHE had temporarily seized. Eventually, this original incarnation of AVALANCHE was crushed and its name taken up by a new group that only consisted of a handful of operatives.

Dirge of Cerberus: Final Fantasy VII
Dirge of Cerberus: Final Fantasy VII reveals that while Reeve Tuesti, Yuffie Kisaragi, Vincent Valentine and the Turks managed to evacuate the populace of the upper plate to Midgar's slum sectors prior to the ending of Final Fantasy VII, storms spawned by the intense gravity generated between Meteor and the Planet tore apart much of the city's upper plates. The main antagonistic faction of Dirge of Cerberus is Deepground, a SOLDIER sect developed as an experimental military project by President Shinra before his death. Trapped deep underground in Midgar by the effects of the Meteor crisis, Midgar becomes a battlefield during the events of Dirge of Cerberus as the World Restoration Organization (WRO) led by Reeve Tuesti engage the re-emerged Deepground forces.

Final Fantasy VII Remake
The entirety of Final Fantasy VII Remake, the first in a planned series of games remaking 1997's Final Fantasy VII, is set in Midgar. The narrative of Remake covers the beginning of the original game to the escape from Midgar by the surviving members of AVALANCHE and their allies with expanded story content. The setting of Midgar in Remake is noted for its linear nature; while the upper plate regions were mostly inaccessible in the original game, Remake allows players to explore many of these areas and interact extensively with its residents through new story scenarios.

Other games
Midgar has appeared as a level or stage in various Final Fantasy spin-off titles outside of the Compilation metaseries. These include Final Fantasy VII G-Bike; Dissidia Final Fantasy and its sequels Dissidia 012 and Dissidia NT; Theatrhythm Final Fantasy and its sequel Curtain Call; and Final Fantasy Airborne Brigade.

Outside of the Final Fantasy franchise, Midgar has appeared in the Itadaki Street series, the Super Smash Bros. series, and Rampage Land Rankers.

Other media
Final Fantasy VII Advent Children expands upon the original ending of Final Fantasy VII, and reveals that the survivors of Midgar used debris from the city to build a new town called "Edge" on the outskirts of Midgar, though much of the population suffer from a plague known as "Geostigma".

Cultural impact
Julie Muncy from Wired noted that the city of Midgar, along with characters like Cloud Strife and Sephiroth, have achieved a level of cultural impact far beyond the games they originate from and "exist with power outside of their context". Stephen K. Hirst from Ars Technica suggested that a major theme of Final Fantasy VII, which involves an armed struggle between members of the working class and a "hyper-capitalist machine hellbent on extracting every ounce of value from the planet" to benefit Midgar's elite, resonated with a generation of players and inspired some to become environmentalist advocates and activists. The city is the namesake and inspiration behind Midgar Studios, the developer of the role-playing game Edge of Eternity.

Midgar has been a popular subject of fan labor, with some fans attempting to recreate the city's likeness in a real world or fictional context. Midgar city has been digitally recreated by fans within other game worlds like Minecraft, and Second Life.

Critical reception
Harry Mackin from Paste Magazine said the opening act of Final Fantasy VII in Midgar is the game's mostly fondly remembered aspect, and that the city recalls the cyberpunk themes of Akira and Blade Runner. Konstantinos Dimopoulos from WireFrame concurred, noting that Midgar is a "place that managed to define, encapsulate, and summarise a whole setting – a pithy urban symbol of FFVIIs world". Jason Faulkner from GameRevolution opined that Midgar is an exemplary JRPG setting which "stands as one of the best examples of world-building in the genre", and the "crowning achievement" of the entire Final Fantasy series. Tom Senior from PC Gamer perceived Midgar's "contradictory identity" to be fascinating in its level of detail, "a breathtaking vision of industrial living gone wrong".

The handling of the city of Midgar in Remake, specifically the expanded detail of its "political conspiracies, everyday desperation, and quiet hope", is lauded by Joe Juba from Game Informer. Marty Sliva from The Escapist approved of the developers' decision to expand the early hours of Final Fantasy VII into a "30-40 hours" experience, noting that he could experience a "new side of Shinra and Midgar", the latter now with its distinct district and fully realized populations instead of the "single amorphous blob of a city" in the original. EGMNOW praised the themes of ecoterrorism and war and the prominent role occupied by Midgar in the narrative. Nadia Oxford from US Gamer found that the visual upgrade of Midgar in Remake provides an unsettling observation on how Midgar's expansion damages the planet it is located in environmentally, as well as the ease of which to spot the parallels of "human excess and hubris" between the real world and the game's sickened world that inevitably leaks to a bleak future.

In regards to the remains of Midgar from Advent Children, Destructoid noted there was a message within the writing of the film regarding the characters' lives in Midgar, leading them to move on with their lives in a similar fashion to Final Fantasy VII gamers since the story ended with Cloud saving Midgar from Sephiroth's resurrection which would threaten it again especially when the spirit of Zack Fair reminds him that he has defeated him already. Kotaku saw the focus on the Midgar's ruins as a parallelism with psychological trauma due to how all of its survivors suffer a disease that cannot be fought with Cloud's striking weaponry on its own.

References

Further reading

External links
 The Architects of Midgar: how we rebuilt FINAL FANTASY VII REMAKEs City of Mako on the official Square Enix Website
 How Final Fantasy VII Remake uses architecture from all over the world on the official Polygon YouTube Channel
 Final Fantasy 7 Remake: A Tour of Midgar on the official IGN YouTube Channel

Dystopian fiction
Fictional city-states
Fictional elements introduced in 1997
Final Fantasy VII
Video game levels
Video game locations